Java–Partizan Pro Cycling Team is a Serbian UCI Continental team founded in 2014. It participates in UCI Continental Circuits races.

Doping
On 20 July 2015 the Chilean Olympic Committee announced that Carlos Oyarzun had been sent home from the 2015 Pan American Games in Toronto after he'd tested positive for the HIF prolyl-hydroxylase inhibitor FG-4592 in a pre-competition test. Oyarzun was due ride the time trial.

Team roster

Major wins
2018
Stage 3 Tour de Indonesia, Charalampos Kastrantas
Overall Grand Prix International de la ville d'Alger, Charalampos Kastrantas
Stage 4, Charalampos Kastrantas

References

UCI Continental Teams (Europe)
Cycling teams established in 2014
2014 establishments in Croatia
Cycling teams based in Croatia
Cycling teams based in Serbia